Coma of Souls is the fifth studio album by German thrash metal band Kreator, released in 1990. It was reissued in 2002, with the lyrics for the last four songs missing from the booklet. Coma of Souls was Kreator's first release with guitarist Frank "Blackfire" Gosdzik (then-formerly of Sodom), and would be the last album before the band began experimenting with influences from other musical genres. It also would be the last record issued in the United States by Epic Records.

Release
Coma of Souls was also released in the United States as a limited edition in purple vinyl. Although the album's lyrics contain no profanity, original copies of Coma of Souls had a Parental Advisory label on the cover. Subsequent pressings of the album do not carry the Parental Advisory label.

In March 2018, German record label Noise released a remastered edition of the album and made it available on CD and vinyl. The release contains a live performance of Kreator at Stadthalle Fürth, Germany on 6 December 1990, and liner notes.

Critical reception

Billboard in its favourable review compared the songwriting of Kreator with that of Metallica and Nuclear Assault and noted lyrical topics: "Songs targeting environmental crisis, war-mongering, and renascent Nazism in band's native land [...] Ecodisaster number 'When The Sun Burns Red' is excellent first course." Rock Hard reviewer considered Coma of Souls an improvement from its predecessor and wrote that "the new songs look mature, elaborately designed, without losing their aggressiveness." Eduardo Rivadavia of AllMusic praised the "overwhelmingly solid songwriting", but found that "Coma of Souls still sounded somewhat repetitive to all but the most unquestioning of fans" and was "guaranteed to thrill lovers of technically proficient thrash."

Track listings

Personnel

Kreator
 Mille Petrozza – vocals, guitar
 Frank "Blackfire" Gosdzik – guitar
 Rob Fioretti – bass
 Ventor – drums

Production
 Randy Burns – producer, engineer, mixing at Music Grinder, Hollywood
 Steve Heinke – engineer, mixing
 Jason Roberts – engineer
 Andreas Marschall – artwork
 Martin Becker – photos
Karl Ulrich Walterbach – executive producer

2018 reissue technical personnel
 Steve Hammonds – compilation
 Andy Pearce, Matt Wortham – mastering
 Olman Viper – live mastering
 Thomas Ewerhard, Jan Meininghaus – art and design
 Holger Stratmann, Thomas Simon – additional photos
 Malcolm Dome  – sleeve notes

Charts

References

Kreator albums
1990 albums
Noise Records albums
Epic Records albums